Harry Jeffrey Kimble (born April 23, 1949), was the William L. Valentine Professor and Professor of Physics at Caltech. His research is in quantum optics and is noted for groundbreaking experiments in physics including one of the first demonstrations of teleportation of a quantum state (first demonstration is disputed with Anton Zeilinger), quantum logic gate, and the development of the first single atom laser.  According to Elizabeth Rogan, OSA CEO,  "Jeff has led a revolution in modern physics through his pioneering research in the coherent control of the interactions of light and matter."   Kimble's main research focus is in quantum information science and the quantum dynamics of open systems.

Education and career
Kimble graduated summa cum laude from Abilene Christian University in 1971 and earned his master's and doctoral degrees from University of Rochester, culminating in 1979. He was advised by Leonard Mandel. As a graduate student under Mandel, Kimble observed the first photon anti-bunching.  He spent two years as a scientist for the General Motors Research Laboratory until 1979 when he joined the faculty at the University of Texas at Austin.   He moved to the California Institute of Technology in 1989.

Kimble is a Fellow of the American Association for the Advancement of Science, the American Physical Society, and the Optical Society of America, and is a member of the National Academy of Sciences.

Honors and awards
 Einstein Prize for Laser Science of the Society for Optical and Quantum Electronics (awarded at Lasers '89)
 The Albert A. Michelson Medal of the Franklin Institute (1990)
 The Max Born Award of the Optical Society of America (1996)
 The International Award on Quantum Communication (1998)
 The Julius Edgar Lilienfeld Prize of the American Physical Society (2004)
 The Berthold Leibinger Zukunftspreis of the German Berthold Leibinger Stiftung (2006)
 degree of Doctor Scientiarum Honoris Causa (2007)
 The Herbert Walther Award (2013)

References

1949 births
Living people
People from Floydada, Texas
21st-century American physicists
Optical physicists
University of Rochester alumni
Abilene Christian University alumni
Members of the United States National Academy of Sciences
California Institute of Technology faculty
Fellows of the American Physical Society
Fellows of Optica (society)
University of Texas at Austin faculty
General Motors people